Joseph Albert Pease, 1st Baron Gainford  (17 January 1860 – 15 February 1943), known as Jack Pease, was a British businessman and Liberal politician. He was a member of H. H. Asquith's Liberal cabinet between 1910 and 1916 and also served as Chairman of the BBC between 1922 and 1926.

Background and education
Pease was born in Darlington, County Durham (a member of the Darlington Peases), the second and youngest son of Sir Joseph Pease, 1st Baronet, of Hutton Hall, Guisborough, and Mary, daughter of Alfred Fox. He was the younger brother of Sir Alfred Pease, 2nd Baronet, the nephew of Arthur Pease and the first cousin of Sir Arthur Pease, 1st Baronet, and Herbert Pease, 1st Baron Daryngton. He was educated at Grove House, Tottenham, a Quaker school, and at Trinity College, Cambridge.

Political career

Pease served as Mayor of Darlington from 1889 to 1890. He was elected Member of Parliament for Tyneside in 1892, a seat he held until 1900 He contested and won a by-election for Saffron Walden in May 1901, and represented that constituency until 1910, and Rotherham between 1910 and 1916. He was private secretary (unpaid) to John Morley, the Chief Secretary for Ireland, between 1893 and 1895 and a junior opposition whip between 1897 and 1905.

When the Liberals came to power in 1905 under Sir Henry Campbell-Bannerman, Pease was appointed a Junior Lord of the Treasury (government whip). After H. H. Asquith became Prime Minister in 1908 he was promoted to Parliamentary Secretary to the Treasury (Chief Whip) and sworn of the Privy Council. In 1910 he entered Asquith's cabinet as Chancellor of the Duchy of Lancaster, a post he held until 1911, and then served under Asquith as President of the Board of Education between 1911 and 1915 and as Postmaster-General in 1916. In 1917 he was raised to the peerage as Baron Gainford, of Headlam in the County of Durham.

He served on the Claims Commission in France in 1915 and between 1917 and 1920 and in Italy between 1918 and 1919 and was also a Deputy Lieutenant of County Durham and a Justice of the Peace for County Durham and the North Riding of Yorkshire.

Business career
Apart from his political career Pease was Deputy Chairman of the Durham Coal Owners Association and Vice-Chairman of the Durham District Board (under the Coal Mines Act 1930), a director of Pease and Partners Ltd and other colliery companies, Chairman of Durham Coke Owners, director of the County of London Electric Supply Company, Chairman of South London Electric Supply Corporation, of the Tees Fishery Board, and of the Trustees of the Bowes Museum.

In 1922 he was appointed Chairman of the British Broadcasting Company Ltd, a post he held until its dissolution and replacement by the British Broadcasting Corporation (BBC) on 31 December 1926, and was vice-chairman of the Board of Governors of the BBC until 1932. From 1927 to 1928 he was President of Federation of British Industry.

Papers
Lord Gainford's papers are deposited in Nuffield College, Oxford and consist of diaries, scrap books, press cuttings, correspondence, domestic papers, political papers, official papers, claims commission papers and BBC papers. The main part of the Pease diaries cover the years 1908–1915 and a volume dealing with the years 1908–1910 have been published by Cameron Hazlehurst and Christine Woodland as A Liberal Chronicle: Journals and Papers of J A Pease, 1908–1910; The Historians Press, London, 1994.

Family
Lord Gainford married Ethel, daughter of Sir Henry Havelock-Allan, 1st Baronet, in 1886. They had one son, Joseph, and two daughters, Miriam and Faith (who married Michael Wentworth Beaumont and was the mother of Lord Beaumont of Whitley). Lady Gainford died in October 1941. Lord Gainford survived her by two years and died in February 1943, aged 83. He was succeeded in the barony by his son, Joseph. The family seat was Headlam Hall, Co Durham.

Arms

See also
List of political families in the United Kingdom

References

Joseph Albert Pease, by Cameron Hazlehurst in Oxford Dictionary of National Biography, OUP 2004–09.

External links 

 

Gainford, Joseph Pease, 1st Baron
Gainford, Joseph Pease, 1st Baron
Alumni of Trinity College, Cambridge
Gainford, Joseph Pease, 1st Baron
BBC Governors
British Secretaries of State for Education
Chairmen of the BBC
Gainford, Joseph Pease, 1st Baron
Deputy Lieutenants of Durham
Pease, Joseph
Mayors of places in North East England
Gainford, Joseph Pease, 1st Baron
Jack
People from Darlington
People from County Durham
Pease, Joseph Albert
Pease, Joseph Albert
Pease, Joseph Albert
Pease, Joseph Albert
Pease, Joseph Albert
Pease, Joseph Albert
UK MPs who were granted peerages
Gainford, Joseph Albert Pease, 1st Baron
Younger sons of baronets
Barons created by George V